Andrew Aldridge Young (born March 23, 1966) is a former key staff member in the John Edwards 2008 presidential campaign, and is noted as the author of political biographical writing. Young came to prominence via a scandal in which he claimed paternity of Rielle Hunter's child born on February 27, 2008. John Edwards had admitted a past affair with Hunter, but denied paternity of the baby even though Edwards was in fact the father. Young has since renounced that statement, and Edwards publicly admitted paternity on January 21, 2010.

Personal life
Young is the son of the late Robert T. Young (1935–2009), a Methodist minister who held positions at churches in Asheville, Boone, Statesville and at Duke Chapel, all in North Carolina; his uncle is the author Perry Deane Young. Young married Cheri Pfister Young  in 1999, with whom he now has three children. Young now resides in Chapel Hill, North Carolina.

Young is a 1984 graduate of C.E. Jordan High School in Durham, North Carolina, where he was a captain of the football team.

Career
Young has worked for the North Carolina Academy of Trial Lawyers. He registered as a lobbyist in 1999 and started working for John Edwards as a campaign staffer. He is a graduate of the Wake Forest University School of Law, though he is not a licensed lawyer.  Young is ex-owner of Winner's Deli in Asheville, North Carolina.

Paternity scandal

Through his attorney, Pamela J. Marple, Andrew Young publicly claimed fatherhood of Rielle Hunter's daughter Quinn in December 2007. As both Young and John Edwards later confirmed, the child was Edwards's, and Young's claim of paternity was part of a cover-up.

DWI and child abuse charges
Shortly before midnight on June 8, 2014, Young was arrested and later charged with impaired driving and misdemeanor child abuse. According to court records, Young "was involved in a road rage incident where he punched a vehicle." Young had twice previously been charged with driving while intoxicated.

Publications
The Politician: An Insider's Account of John Edwards's Pursuit of the Presidency and the Scandal That Brought Him Down, Thomas Dunne Books, 2010

References

Living people
1966 births
Wake Forest University School of Law alumni
North Carolina Democrats
American lobbyists
American political writers
American male non-fiction writers
Child abuse incidents and cases
John Edwards
People from Chapel Hill, North Carolina